Faridpur is a small village located in Hussainganj Block of Siwan District of Bihar State.

Faridpur is a small village situated on the banks of the river Daha, this river is a tributary of the Ganges River, this village is not fully developed but the people here are quite educated and this village was also visited by our former Prime Minister Indra Gandhi Has visited, and here is Mohammad Nesar Ansari, grandson of Alam Ansari, a respected person of our country.

Siwan district